Dan Norris (born 28 January 1960) is a British Labour Party politician serving as the Mayor of the West of England since May 2021. He previously served as the Member of Parliament (MP) for Wansdyke from 1997 to 2010.

Norris served in government as the Parliamentary-Under Secretary of State for Rural Affairs and Environment from 2009 to 2010, and an assistant whip from 2001 to 2003.

Early life
Dan Norris was born on 28 January 1960 in London to parents June Norris and David Norris. His mother was a Labour councillor who stood as the candidate for the Northavon constituency in the 1983 general election and the 1992 general election. His father worked as a sales manager and as a social worker.
Norris was educated at Chipping Sodbury School and the University of Sussex, where he completed a master's degree in social work. He is a former teacher and child protection officer, having trained with the NSPCC.

Before parliament
Norris was a councillor on Bristol City Council for the Brislington West ward from 1989 to 1992 and from 1995 to 1997, and a councillor on Avon County Council from 1994 to 1996. He is a member of the GMB trade union.

Parliamentary career
Norris first stood for parliament in the constituency of Northavon in 1987, losing against the Conservative incumbent, John Cope. In 1992, he was the Labour candidate for Wansdyke in Somerset, coming in second place against the Conservative incumbent, Jack Aspinwall. He contested the Wansdyke seat again in the election of 1997, and this time succeeded in taking it with a majority of 4,799, overturning a Conservative majority of 11,770 votes. Norris went on to increase his majority to 5,613 in the election of 2001.

Norris has a particular interest in child safety and regularly campaigns against child sexual abuse, having co-written a free booklet on its prevention. He also co-wrote, produced and distributed a booklet, Don't Bully Me, giving practical advice to children across the United Kingdom on dealing with bullying.

Norris was an assistant whip for the Treasury from June 2001 to June 2003. In May 2006 he was appointed Parliamentary Private Secretary (PPS) to Secretary of State for Northern Ireland Peter Hain until June 2007, then PPS to Foreign Secretary David Miliband to January 2009. In the reshuffle of June 2009 Norris entered government as a minister for the first time, becoming Parliamentary Under Secretary of State at the Department for the Environment, Food and Rural Affairs (Minister for Rural Affairs and Environment).

Norris had long campaigned against fox hunting, supporting the legislation outlawing it. On the final day of legal fox hunting, 28 February 2005, he was egged by Duke of Beaufort's Hunt supporters in Badminton recorded live on regional television news.

The 2005 general election saw his lead over the Conservatives fall to 1,839. Due to changes made by the Boundary Commission for England, the Wansdyke constituency was abolished at the 2010 election. Norris stood instead for the North East Somerset seat which covered most of the same area, but was defeated by the Conservative candidate Jacob Rees-Mogg.

Later career
Following his defeat at the 2010 general election, Norris worked for David Miliband in his unsuccessful bid for the Labour leadership. In May 2012, Norris was shortlisted to be the Labour Party candidate for the Bristol mayoral election, but did not win the selection. As of 2016 he was Head of Operations for the Russell Group of Universities, and he has run businesses. Norris was critical of Jeremy Corbyn's leadership of the Labour Party's handling of antisemitism, stating in an op-ed for the Bristol Post, "today’s Labour leadership seems to have become highly uncomfortable in opposing racism when it is directed at Jewish people".

In 2004, Norris was appointed to the board of the Snowdon Trust, a charity that supports students with physical disabilities. Norris is an ambassador for the children's charity Kidscape. He is a trustee of the League Against Cruel Sports, becoming chair in October 2022.

Mayor of the West of England

Candidacy 
Norris was selected as the Labour Party candidate on 16 November 2020, defeating Bristol councillor Helen Godwin in a vote of local members by 1,611 votes to 1,558. During the election campaign, the leader of the Labour Party Keir Starmer visited Bath to campaign with him. They were asked to leave a pub by its landlord, who opposed the use of lockdowns as part of the government's response to the COVID-19 pandemic. 

During the election campaign, Norris said that incumbent mayor Tim Bowles was the "only metro mayor who doesn't have more powers than when he started", and that if elected he would seek more money and powers from central government. He said he would establish a "Green Recovery Fund" to create 23,000 jobs by investing in "home retrofitting, tree-planting, flood and drought defences, and renewable energy".

Mayoralty 
Norris was elected as the mayor of the West of England in the 2021 West of England mayoral election, a role which had previously been held by the Conservative Tim Bowles. Upon taking office, he became entitled to the style of Mayor. He credited his victory to the leadership of Keir Starmer. He said he would support North Somerset and parts of Somerset joining the combined authority, and he would seek additional funds for them.

In his first public meeting of the West of England Combined Authority (WECA), Norris vetoed a proposal supported by the leaders of the three constituent councils to spend £100,000 reviewing how the authority functions and makes decisions. At a meeting in July, Norris and the council leaders rejected most of a climate action plan that the authority had been developing since 2019 as insufficiently ambitious, and to begin developing a replacement. Also in July 2021, Norris launched new schemes to support the creative and food industries in the region.

In the October 2021 budget the UK government allocated £540 million to WECA over a five year period for public transport improvements, which will predominantly be spent on improving bus services. This includes £48 million for a park and ride scheme near the M32 strategic corridor from South Gloucestershire to Bristol. The funding is from the Department for Transport City Region Sustainable Transport Settlements scheme.

There was a dispute between WECA members and Norris over the mayor's powers, in particular a power to veto alternative proposals to their joint committee which included North Somerset Council. The four local authorities’ monitoring officers, who give legal advice, stated the veto could arguably amount to maladministration. On 15 October 2021, the four council leaders did not attend a WECA meeting with the mayor, which meant over £50 million of spending decisions could not be made. Norris stated "I would agree that [my predecessor] gave into them, I am not prepared to do that ... I’m not really bothered about procedures or legal arguments, frankly. I’m determined to get policies through and things delivered." A former non-voting member of WECA, Vice-Chancellor of the University of the West of England Professor Steve West, was appointed as mediator in the dispute. In November 2021, after taking new legal advice, Norris agreed not to claim veto powers on decisions involving North Somerset.

In November 2021, the combined authority submitted a plan for a "seamless" public transport system with a single brand and payment system across buses and trains and across different operators. South Gloucestershire Council asked for funding from WECA for a pedestrianisation scheme on Thornbury's high street, which Norris threatened to withhold unless the council further consulted residents. In the same month, Norris signed WECA up to a charter committing to support staff diagnosed with terminal illness, and urged organisations across the West of England to do likewise. He supported a strike by the University and College Union in Bristol in December 2021.

Spatial Development Strategy
A major responsibility of WECA and the mayor is the development of a Spatial Development Strategy (SDS), which will guide major planning decisions in the area and thus development direction. A somewhat similar Joint Spatial Plan was previously being developed by the area's unitary authorities in a four year process, and included building three new "garden villages". In 2019 the plan was withdrawn after the Planning Inspectorate criticised it as not "robust, consistent or objective".
Consequently producing a SDS for WECA to agree became a priority for the new mayor. The SDS covers the period to 2041, and needs a 12-week public consultation before a public examination by the Planning Inspectorate in early 2023.

In March 2022, Norris stated that the region's greenbelt was "not fit for purpose". He argued that there should be no overall greenbelt area reduction, but limited changes to extend urban areas in a few places should be permitted. There was a current proposal by the owners of Ashton Gate Stadium to build 500 homes on the neighbouring greenbelt as part of a "sporting quarter" development.

The mayor and the leader of South Gloucestershire council dispute the amount of new housing proposed in WECA's forthcoming SDS, publishing of which was deferred. In May 2022, Norris told the government that agreement of a SDS was impossible, blaming South Gloucestershire council for leaving discussions, which was denied by South Gloucestershire's leader. Subsequently the three councils started developing their own individual Local Plans, which Norris had described as parochial.

Bibliography
Violence Against Social Workers: The Implications for Practice, Jessica Kingsley Publishers, 1989 (with Carol Kedward).

References

External links

 
 
 Dan Morris's record as an MP on TheyWorkForYou
 Voting record at the Public Whip

1960 births
Living people
Labour Party (UK) MPs for English constituencies
Labour Friends of Israel
Councillors in South West England
Mayors of the West of England
Politics of Bath and North East Somerset
British businesspeople
National Society for the Prevention of Cruelty to Children people
Alumni of the University of Sussex
UK MPs 1997–2001
UK MPs 2001–2005
UK MPs 2005–2010
Labour Party (UK) mayors